Phil Collins (born 1951) is a musician with the band Genesis.

Phil or Philip Collins may also refer to:
 Phil Collins (baseball) (1901–1948), Major League pitcher
 Phil Collins (speedway rider) (born 1960), English international motorcycle racer
 Philip Collins (journalist) (born 1967), British journalist
 Phil Collins (artist) (born 1970), British photographer and artist
 Phillip Collins (cyclist) (born 1972), Irish Olympic cyclist
 Phil Collins (politician) (born 1967), American politician
 Philip R. Collins, proprietor of Barometer World in Devon, England
 Philadelphia "Phil" Collins, character in the Trailer Park Boys

See also
 Collins (surname)
 Phil Collen (born 1957), lead guitarist for Def Leppard
 The Phil Collins Big Band, a 1990s side project of the musician
 Phil Collinson (born 1970), British television producer